  
Legsby (otherwise Legesby) is a small village and civil parish in the West Lindsey district of Lincolnshire, England. The population of the civil parish at the 2011 census was 193.

The parish includes the settlements of Bleasby,  Bleasby Moor, Collow, and East Torrington.

History
In the Domesday account Legsby is recorded as "Lagesbi". It consisted of 6 villagers and 1 smallholder, 2 ploughlands, a meadow and woodland of  each and a mill. In 1066 Alsi son of Godram held the lordship of the manor, transferred to Everard of Leathley in 1086, with Tenant-in-Chief becoming William of Percy. Domesday notes a now nonexistent village of Holtham in Legsby, named "Houten",  to the east, with 4 villagers, 2 smallholders, 6 freemen, 2 ploughlands, a 30-acre meadow, and lord and tenantship as Legsby. Bleasby, "Belesbi", contained 2 villagers, 2 smallholders and 2 freemen, with 3 ploughlands, a meadow and woodland of  each, and Aghmund son of Walraven as lord in 1066, becoming Herman, with Tenant-in Chief as Jocelyn son of Lambert, in 1086.

To the north and south of St Thomas' church are earthworks and a hollow way, indicating Legsby medieval village. By 1187 the village and church had been granted to the Gilbertine priory of Sixhills. At the 1541 Suppression Legsby manor was given to Charles Brandon, Duke of Suffolk, who sold it the same year. The estate was later bought by Richard Nelthorpe, and it remained in the Nettlethorpe family until the early 20th century.

Pevsner saw the moat as "surprisingly small but quite unmistakable". The mound probably existed before the 12th century establishment of the adjacent Collow township.

The settlement remains of the Legsby hamlet of Holtham, in the 16th century known as Howdome and comprising four families, is defined by crop mark evidence of a moated monastic or manor house, and a ridge and furrow field system. Earthwork remains of a moat, paddocks, ditch, enclosures and trackways were visible in 1846, but were demolished in the 1960s.

Machinery finds could indicate a 16th- or 17th-century mill, and moat, pond, ditch, croft and field earthworks of a defensive homestead.

The hamlet was conjoined with West Torrington in the 14th century. The present St Michael's church was designed by Samuel Sanders Teulon, and was built on, or close to, a previous church.

Kelly's 1885 Directory records Major Robert Nassau Sutton JP as lord of the manor, and a principal landowner with Edward Heneage MP, DL, JP. It held a Wesleyan chapel and a church school for 50 children. There were nine farms, one a Glebe farm, two shoe makers, a blacksmith, shopkeeper and wheelwright. Bleasby hamlet held Methodist and Free Methodist chapels, four farms and a wheelwright, and Collow hamlet, two farms.

Church
Legsby Grade II listed Anglican church is dedicated to St Thomas. It is originally 13th-century, and of Early English and Tudor styles, and includes a chancel, nave, and obelisk style pinnacled tower containing one bell. A stained glass east window was inserted in memory of a mid-19th-century vicar. Pevsner records that the church was probably altered in the 18th century, with a shortening of the chancel, and has a Norman font, Kelly's giving it Romanesque attribution, and a chalice and paten cover dated 1569. Cox believes that the font and chalice are the only thing of interest in the church.

References

External links

"Legsby (Legesby)", Genuki.org.uk. Retrieved 23 April 2012

Villages in Lincolnshire
Civil parishes in Lincolnshire
West Lindsey District